Break in the Circle is a 1955 British drama film directed by Val Guest and starring Forrest Tucker, Eva Bartok, Marius Goring and Guy Middleton.

Doreen Carwithen composed the score for the film.

Plot
An adventurer is hired by a German millionaire to help a Polish scientist escape to the West.

Cast
 Forrest Tucker as Captain Skip Morgan 
 Eva Bartok as Lisa 
 Marius Goring as Baron Keller 
 Guy Middleton as Major Hobart 
 Eric Pohlmann as Emile 
 Arnold Marlé as Professor Pal Kudnic 
 Fred Johnson as Chief Agent Farquarson 
 David King-Wood as Colonel Patchway 
 Reginald Beckwith as Dusty 
 Guido Lorraine as Franz
 André Mikhelson as Russian thug  
 Stanley Zevic as Russian thug 
 Marne Maitland as The phony Kudnic  
 Arthur Lovegrove as Bert

References

External links

1955 films
1955 drama films
British drama films
Cold War films
1950s English-language films
Films directed by Val Guest
Films based on British novels
Films set in West Germany
Films set in East Germany
Seafaring films
Hammer Film Productions films
1950s British films